Commmons is a Japanese record label founded by Japanese  musician Ryuichi Sakamoto. Avex Group, Japan's biggest independent record label, is its official parent company.

History
Commmons was founded in 2006 by Sakamoto with the help of Avex and its founder and president, Max Matsuura. The word Commmons has three M's because the 3rd M stands for music. On the initiative's "About" page, the label is described as a project that "aims to find new possibilities for music, while making meaningful contribution to culture and society."

Distribution
It is distributed by Rhythm Zone, Avex's urban and R&B record label, and uses the catalog code "RZCM-4****". It also serves as a distributing label for Thrill Jockey and Raster-Noton in Japan.

Artists
 Aoki Takamasa
 Asa-Chang & Junray
 Boredoms
 Christian Fennesz
 Kotringo
 OOIOO
 Ryuichi Sakamoto (Founder)
 Penguin Cafe Orchestra
 Sōtaisei Riron (Mirai Records/commmons)
 Takeshi Ueda
 Yellow Magic Orchestra

Slogan
Commmons' official slogan is Think Global, Act Local.

See also
 Avex Group
 List of record labels

References

External links
 
 Commmons Mart
 Commmons Mag

 
 Official blog

Record labels owned by Avex Group
Japanese record labels
Record labels established in 2006